Gary Albert Knight (born 26 August 1951) is a former New Zealand rugby union player and amateur wrestler.

Rugby union
A prop, Knight represented Horowhenua and Manawatu at a provincial level, and was a member of the New Zealand national side, the All Blacks, from 1977 to 1986. He played 66 matches for the All Blacks, including 36 internationals.

While playing for the All Blacks during the 1981 springbok tour Knight was famously felled by a flour bomb dropped by Marx Jones.

Wrestling
Knight competed for New Zealand in the super heavyweight (+100 kg) division of freestyle wrestling at the 1974 British Commonwealth Games in Christchurch, winning the bronze medal.

References

1951 births
Rugby union players from Wellington City
Living people
Sportspeople from Wellington City
People educated at Mana College
New Zealand rugby union players
New Zealand international rugby union players
Horowhenua-Kapiti rugby union players
Manawatu rugby union players
Rugby union props
Wrestlers at the 1974 British Commonwealth Games
Commonwealth Games bronze medallists for New Zealand
New Zealand male sport wrestlers
Commonwealth Games medallists in wrestling
Medallists at the 1974 British Commonwealth Games